Urakhi (Dargwa: Хӏурхъи) is a rural locality (a selo) and the administrative centre of Urakhinsky Selsoviet, Sergokalinsky District, Republic of Dagestan, Russia. The population was 671 as of 2010.

Geography 
Urakhi is located 22 km southwest of Sergokala (the district's administrative centre) by road. Verkhniye Makhargimakhi and Nizhneye Mulebki are the nearest rural localities.

Nationalities 
Dargins live there.

Famous residents
 Alibek Takho-Godi (Soviet revolutionary, statesman and public figure of Dagestan)

References 

Rural localities in Sergokalinsky District